Lawrence Wilson (born 1987) is an American football player.

Lawrence Wilson or Laurence Wilson may also refer to:

 Lawrence Elery Wilson (1884–1946), American businessman and politician
 Lawrence Alexander Wilson (1863–1934), Canadian politician and philanthropist
 Laurence Wilson (born 1986), English footballer

See also 
 Larry Wilson (disambiguation)